Blake C. Jones (born January 12, 1997) is an American professional stock car racing driver. He last competed part-time in the Monster Energy NASCAR Cup Series, driving the No. 77 Chevrolet Camaro ZL1 for Spire Motorsports.

Racing career

Monster Energy Cup Series
In July 2018, Jones made his Monster Energy NASCAR Cup Series debut at Loudon, where he drove the No. 23 Toyota Camry for BK Racing. He finished 33rd.

On September 29, 2019, Jones was announced to drive the Spire Motorsports No. 77 Chevrolet Camaro ZL1 at the October Talladega race.

NASCAR Xfinity Series
Jones made his NASCAR debut in 2016, driving the No. 15 Ford Mustang GT for B. J. McLeod Motorsports. This was his only race in the season.

In 2018, Jones returned to NASCAR with B. J. McLeod Motorsports. He has participated in five races so far, with a best finish of 24th at Chicago.

Motorsports career results

NASCAR
(key) (Bold – Pole position awarded by qualifying time. Italics – Pole position earned by points standings or practice time. * – Most laps led.)

Monster Energy Cup Series

Xfinity Series

K&N Pro Series East

ARCA Racing Series
(key) (Bold – Pole position awarded by qualifying time. Italics – Pole position earned by points standings or practice time. * – Most laps led.)

 Season still in progress
 Ineligible for series points

References

External links
 

Living people
1997 births
NASCAR drivers
Racing drivers from Tennessee